The 2nd Army was a field army of the German Army during World War II.

History

1939-1945 
The 2nd Army headquarters was briefly established in Berlin from Group Command 1 on 26 August 1939 and at the beginning of the Invasion of Poland it was renamed Army Group North on 2 September. 

The 2nd Army was reestablished on 20 October 1939, with Generaloberst Maximilian von Weichs in command, by renaming the 8th Army, which had been moved from Poland to the west. It was assigned to the reserve of the Oberkommando des Heeres (OKH). After the beginning of the Battle of France on 10 May, the army was assigned to Army Group A and marched through Luxembourg, Belgium, and northern France. From 31 May to 4 June it marched to the front north of the Somme, Aisne, and Oise and participated in the expansion of bridgeheads. When it entered battle on 9 June on the Aisne, the army included IX (295th and 294th Infantry Divisions), XXVI (34th and 45th Infantry Divisions), and VI Army Corps (205th, 15th, 293rd, and 5th Infantry Divisions). First seeing service in France, the army was involved in the invasion of the Balkans, before offensive operations in Ukraine as part of Operation Barbarossa.

In 1942 the 2nd Army covered the northern wing of Case Blue operating in the surroundings of Voronezh. Generaloberst Hans von Salmuth became commander on 14 July. It suffered a major defeat during the Voronezh-Kastornensk operation the Soviet winter offensive that followed the battle of Stalingrad. Generaloberst Walter Weiß became commander on 4 February 1943.

General der Panzertruppe Dietrich von Saucken became commander of the army on 10 March 1945. The army was renamed Army East Prussia on 7 April and was pivotal in the defence of East and West Prussia before end of World War II in Europe on 9 May 1945.

Commanders

See also
 2nd Army (German Empire) for the equivalent formation in World War I

References

Citations

Bibliography 

 

02
Military units and formations established in 1939
Military units and formations disestablished in 1945